Mayetta is a city in Jackson County, Kansas, United States.  As of the 2020 census, the population of the city was 348.

History
Mayetta was laid out and platted in 1886. It was named for Mary Henrietta Lunger, the young daughter of the town's founder who had died some time before.

The first post office in Mayetta was established in February 1886.

Geography
Mayetta is located at  (39.338776, -95.721943).

Demographics

Mayetta is part of the Topeka, Kansas Metropolitan Statistical Area.

2010 census
As of the census of 2010, there were 341 people, 125 households, and 85 families living in the city. The racial makeup of the city was 82.1% White, 1.5% African American, 11.1% Native American, 0.3% from other races, and 5.0% from two or more races. Hispanic or Latino of any race were 2.1% of the population.

There were 125 households, of which 43.2% had children under the age of 18 living with them, 42.4% were married couples living together, 16.8% had a female householder with no husband present, 8.8% had a male householder with no wife present, and 32.0% were non-families. 26.4% of all households were made up of individuals, and 10.4% had someone living alone who was 65 years of age or older. The average household size was 2.73 and the average family size was 3.15.

The median age in the city was 32.5 years. 32.8% of residents were under the age of 18; 7% were between the ages of 18 and 24; 29.5% were from 25 to 44; 22.8% were from 45 to 64; and 7.6% were 65 years of age or older. The gender makeup of the city was 52.5% male and 47.5% female.

2000 census
As of the census of 2000, there were 312 people, 111 households, and 75 families living in the city. The racial makeup of the city was 80.77% White, 14.10% Native American, 0.32% from other races, and 4.81% from two or more races. Hispanic or Latino of any race were 0.96% of the population.

There were 111 households, out of which 46.8% had children under the age of 18 living with them, 51.4% were married couples living together, 15.3% had a female householder with no husband present, and 32.4% were non-families. 24.3% of all households were made up of individuals, and 9.9% had someone living alone who was 65 years of age or older. The average household size was 2.81 and the average family size was 3.40.

In the city, the population was spread out, with 37.2% under the age of 18, 8.0% from 18 to 24, 31.4% from 25 to 44, 15.1% from 45 to 64, and 8.3% who were 65 years of age or older. The median age was 28 years. For every 100 females, there were 97.5 males. For every 100 females age 18 and over, there were 90.3 males.

The median income for a household in the city was $38,542, and the median income for a family was $43,500. Males had a median income of $25,313 versus $21,500 for females. The per capita income for the city was $14,800. About 2.4% of families and 3.9% of the population were below the poverty line, including 4.4% of those under age 18 and 4.5% of those age 65 or over.

Notable people
 Minnie Evans, leader of the Potawatomi Nation, was born in Mayetta.
 Bill James, baseball writer and expert grew up in Mayetta.

See also
 Prairie Band Casino & Resort

References

Further reading

External links
 City of Mayetta
 Mayetta - Directory of Public Officials
 USD 337, local school district
 Mayetta city map, KDOT

Cities in Kansas
Cities in Jackson County, Kansas
Topeka metropolitan area, Kansas